Mya is a primarily feminine given name of uncertain origins. One source considers it to be a 20th-century phonetic spelling of the name Maya or Mia, names that have multiple, different meanings and origins in different languages. The American poet and civil rights activist Maya Angelou, born Marguerite, is said to have acquired her nickname as a child when her brother referred to her as "mya sister". Mya is also a Burmese name of a different origin, said by one source to mean emerald, in use for both sexes.

Usage
The name has been ranked among the top one thousand names for newborn girls in the United States since 1997 and was among the two hundred most used names for American girls between 1999 and 2018.  It was the 270th most used name for American girls born in 2021.

Notable people
Mya Aye, born 1966, Burmese activist and one of the leaders of the 8888 generation of pro-democracy student activists in Burma (Myanmar)
Mya Aye, (1942–2013), Burmese educator and Minister of Education from 2011 to 2013
Mya Aye, Burmese professional golfer, born 1940
Mya Azzopardi, born 2002, Maltese swimmer
Mya Baker, born 1974, also known as Mya B., American filmmaker, poet, writer, director and researcher
Mya Bollaers, Belgian actress 
Mya Breitbart, American biologist and professor of biological oceanography at the University of South Florida's College of Marine Science
Mya Byrne, born 1978, American singer-songwriter
Mya-Rose Craig, born 2002, British-Bangladeshi ornithologist and campaigner for equal rights
Mya Diamond, born 1981, Hungarian pornographic actress and erotic model. 
Mya Harrison, known by the stage name Mýa, American R & B singer, born 1979
Mya-Lecia Naylor (2002–2019), English actress, model and singer
Mya Rose, born 1979, American indie folk-alternative artist
Mya Sein, (1904–1988), Burmese writer, educator and historian
Mya Taylor, born 1991, American actress and singer
Mya Than Tint ( (1929–1998), five-time Myanmar National Literature Award winning Burmese writer and translator
Mya Thwe Thwe Khine (2001–2021), a young Burmese woman who became the first known casualty of the 2021 Myanmar protests, which formed in the aftermath of the 2021 Myanmar coup d'état
Mya Thwin  (1925–2017), Theravada Buddhist meditation teacher who has established centres for vipassana meditation around the world
Mya Tun Oo, born 1961, Myanmar's incumbent Minister for Defence

Notes